Bolshoy Yug is a rural locality (a village) in Chernushinsky District, Perm Krai, Russia. The population was 118 as of 2010. There is 1 street.

Geography 
Bolshoy Yug is located 27 km southwest of Chernushka (the district's administrative centre) by road. Verkh-Yemash is the nearest rural locality.

References 

Rural localities in Chernushinsky District